The 1985–86 La Liga season, the 55th since its establishment, started on August 31, 1985, and finished on April 20, 1986.

Barcelona lost their defence of the title to Real Madrid, who won the title by an 11-point margin.

This season marked Valencia CF's only relegation from La Liga.

Teams and locations

League table

Results table

Pichichi Trophy

References 

La Liga seasons
1985–86 in Spanish football leagues
Spain